Maude is a television series created as the first spin-off of All in the Family featuring Maude Findlay (Bea Arthur), Edith Bunker's cousin, who appeared in two episodes of the latter series' second season.

The first season of Maude was previously released on DVD by Sony Pictures Home Entertainment.  In 2015, the complete series was made available in a large boxed set from Shout Factory.

Series overview

Episodes

Season 1 (1972–73)

Season 2 (1973–74)

Season 3 (1974–75)

Season 4 (1975–76)

Season 5 (1976–77)

Season 6 (1977–78)

References

External links 
 

Maude